is a single released by Dir En Grey on January 20, 1999. It is among the first to feature remixes and was released simultaneously along with "Yurameki" and "-Zan-". The single peaked at number 7 on the Oricon music charts in Japan.

Track listing

Personnel 
 Dir En Grey
 Kyo – vocals, lyricist
 Kaoru – guitar, composer
 Die – guitar
 Toshiya – bass guitar
 Shinya – drums, composer
 Yoshiki Hayashi – producer
 Bill Kennedy (Precision Mastering) – mastering
 Paul DeCarli – remixing

References 

1999 singles
Dir En Grey songs
Songs written by Kyo (musician)
1999 songs
East West Records singles